Michael Handel is an American mathematician known for his work in Geometric group theory. He is a Professor in the Department of Mathematics at Lehman College of The City University of New York and a Professor of Mathematics at The Graduate Center of The City University of New York.

Career
Michael Handel graduated with a B.A. in mathematics from Brandeis University in 1971. He received his Ph.D. from University of California, Berkeley in 1975 under the supervision of Robion Kirby. From 1975 to 1978, he was an instructor at Princeton University. He joined the faculty of Michigan State University as an Assistant Professor in 1978, and was promoted to Associate Professor in 1983. Handel was a visiting scholar at the Institute for Advanced Study from 1978 to 1979, and again from 1987 to 1988. In 1990, he joined the Mathematics Department at Lehman College.

Handel is best known for developing the Train track map method in Geometric group theory in collaboration with Mladen Bestvina in 1992. Bestvina, Feighn and Handel later proved that the group Out(Fn) satisfies the Tits alternative, settling a long-standing open problem.

Awards and honors
In 1984, Handel won a Sloan Research Fellowship.
In 2014, he became a fellow of the American Mathematical Society.

Selected publications
Handel, Michael. "One Dimensional Minimal Sets and the Seifert Conjecture ". Annals of Mathematics (2) 111 (1980), no. 1, 35-66. DOI:10.2307/1971216
Feighn, Mark; Handel, Michael. "Mapping tori of free group automorphisms are coherent". Annals of Mathematics (2) 149 (1999), no. 3, 1061–1077. MR 1709311
Bestvina, Mladen; Feighn, Mark; Handel, Michael. The Tits alternative for Out(Fn). I. Dynamics of exponentially-growing automorphisms.  Annals of Mathematics (2), vol. 151  (2000),  no. 2, pp. 517–623
Bestvina, Mladen; Feighn, Mark; Handel, Michael.  The Tits alternative for Out(Fn). II. A Kolchin type theorem.  Annals of Mathematics (2), vol. 161  (2005),  no. 1, pp. 1–59 MR 2150382
Handel, Michael; Mosher, Lee. "The free splitting complex of a free group, I: hyperbolicity". Geometry & Topology 17 (2013), no. 3, 1581–1672. MR 3073931

See also
Out(Fn)
Train track map
Pseudo-Anosov map

References

External links 
Department of Mathematics - Faculty - Lehman College
Instituto de Matemática Interdisciplinar

University of California, Berkeley alumni
Living people
20th-century American mathematicians
21st-century American mathematicians
Fellows of the American Mathematical Society
Institute for Advanced Study visiting scholars
Lehman College faculty
Graduate Center, CUNY faculty
City University of New York faculty
Mathematicians from New York (state)
Year of birth missing (living people)